Bingara was an electoral district of the Legislative Assembly in the Australian state of New South Wales, created in 1894, partly from New England, and named after and including Bingara. It was abolished in 1920, with the introduction of proportional representation.

Members for Bingara

Election results

References

Former electoral districts of New South Wales
New England (New South Wales)
Constituencies established in 1894
Constituencies disestablished in 1920
1894 establishments in Australia
1920 disestablishments in Australia